The following is a list of the Dead Sea Scrolls from the cave 4 near Qumran.

Description

Wadi Qumran Cave 4 was discovered in August 1952, and was excavated from 22–29 September 1952 by Gerald Lankester Harding, Roland de Vaux, and Józef Milik. Cave 4 is actually two hand-cut caves (4a and 4b), but since the fragments were mixed, they are labeled as 4Q. Cave 4 is the most famous of Qumran caves both because of its visibility from the Qumran plateau and its productivity. It is visible from the plateau to the south of the Qumran settlement. It is by far the most productive of all Qumran caves, producing ninety percent of the Dead Sea Scrolls and scroll fragments (approx. 15,000 fragments from 500 different texts), including 9–10 copies of Jubilees, along with 21 tefillin and 7 mezuzot.

List of manuscripts
Some resources for more complete information on the scrolls are the book by Emanuel Tov, "Revised Lists of the Texts from the Judaean Desert" for a complete list of all of the Dead Sea Scroll texts, as well as the online webpages for the Shrine of the Book and the Leon Levy Collection, both of which present photographs and images of the scrolls and fragments themselves for closer study. Information is not always comprehensive, as content for many scrolls has not yet been fully published.

4Q1–4Q100
{|class="wikitable collapsible collapsed"
|-
! Fragment or Scroll Identifier
! Fragment or Scroll Name
! Alternative Identifier
! English Bible Association
! Language
! Date/Script
! Description
! Reference
|-
!colspan="8" style="background:#b8c7d6;"|
Qumran Cave 4
|-
|4QGen-Exod|| Genesis–Exodus
|4Q1
|Genesis 8:20–21; Exodus 1–4; 5:3–17; 6:4–21,25; 7:5–13,15–20; 8:20–22; 9:8; 22:14; 27:38–39,42–43; 34:17–21
|Hebrew
|Hasmonean
|Fragments from Genesis to Numbers
|
|-
|4QGen
|rowspan="12"|Genesis
|4Q2
|Genesis 1:1–27; 2:14–19; 4:2–4; 5:13
|Hebrew
|Roman
|Fragment of Genesis
|
|-
|4QGen
|4Q3
|Genesis 40–41
|Hebrew
|Herodian
|Fragments of Genesis
|
|-
|4QGen
|4Q4
|Genesis 1:18–27
|Hebrew
|Hasmonean
|Fragments of Genesis on the Beginning of Creation
|
|-
|4QGen
|4Q5
|Genesis 36–37; 40–43; 49
|Hebrew
|Herodian
|Fragments of Genesis
|
|-
|4QGen
|4Q6
|Genesis 48:1–11
|Hebrew
|Hasmonean
|Fragments of Genesis
|
|-
|4QGen
|4Q7
|Genesis 1:1–11,13–22; 2:6–7
|Hebrew
|Hasmonean
|Fragments of Genesis about Creation
|
|-
|4QGen/4QGen
|4Q8
|Genesis 1:8–10
|rowspan=4|Hebrew
|rowspan=4|Herodian
|rowspan=2|Fragments of Genesis about the beginning to early mankind.
|
|-
|4QGen
|4Q8a
|Genesis 2:17–18
|
|-
|4QGen
|4Q8b
|Genesis 12:4–5
|A paraphrase of Genesis
|
|-
|4QGen
|4Q8c
|Genesis
|The title of a Genesis manuscript
|
|-
| 4QGen
|4Q9
|Genesis 41–43; 45
|Hebrew
|Herodian
|Fragments of Genesis
|
|-
|4QGen
|4Q10
|Genesis 1:9,14–16,27–28; 2:1–3; 3:1–2
|Hebrew
|Herodian
|Fragments of Genesis
|
|-
|4QpaleoGen-Exod|| Paleo-Genesis/Exodus
|4Q11
|Genesis 50:26; Exodus 1:1–5; 2:10,22–25; 3:1–4,17–21; 8:13–15, 19–21; 9:25–29, 33–35; 10:1–5; 11:4–10; 12:1–11, 42–46; 14:15–24; 16:2–7, 13–14,18–20,23–25,26–31,33–35; 17:1–3,5–11; 18:17–24; 19:24–25; 20:1–2; 22:23–24; 23:5–16; 25:7–20; 26:29–37; 27:1, 6–14; 28:33–35,40–42; 36:34–36
|Hebrew
|Hasmonean; Paleo-Hebrew script
|Fragments of Genesis and Exodus
|
|-
|4QpaleoGen
|Paleo-Genesis
|4Q12
|Genesis 26:21–28; Exodus 6:25–30; 7:1–19,29; 8:1,5,12–26; 9:5–16,19–21,35; 10:1–12,19–28; 11:8–10; 12:1–2,6–8,13–15,17–22,31–32,34–39; 13:3–7,12–13; 14:3–5,8–9,25–26; 15:23–27; 16:1,4–5,7–8,31–35; 17:1–16; 18:1–27; 19:1,7–17,23–25; 20:1,18–19; 21:5–6, 13–14,22–32; 22:3–4,6–7,11–13,16–30; 23:15–16,19–31; 24:1–4,6–11; 25:11–12,20–29,31–34; 26:8,15,21–30; 27:1–3,9–14,18–19; 28:3–4,8–12,22–24,26–28,30–43; 29:1–5,20,22–25,31–41; 30:10,12–18,29–31,34–38; 31:1–8,13–15; 32:2–19,25–30; 33:12–23; 34:1–3,10–13,15–18,20–24,27–28; 35:1; 36:21–24; 37:9–16
|Hebrew
|Hasmonean; Paleo-Hebrew script
|Fragment from Genesis
|
|-
|4QExod
|rowspan=4|Exodus
|4Q13
|Exodus 1:1–6,16–12; 2:2–18; 3:13 – 4:8; 5:3–14
|Hebrew
|Herodian
|Fragments of Exodus about Slavery in Egypt
|
|-
|4QExod
|4Q14
|Exodus 7:17–19,20–23; 7:26 – 8:1; 8:5–14,16–18,22; 9:10–11,15–20,22–25,27–35; 10:1–5,7–9,12–19,23–24; 11:9–10; 12:12–16,31–48; 13:18 – 14:3; 14:3–13; 17:1 – 18:12
|Hebrew
|Herodian
|Fragments of Exodus
|
|-
|4QExod
|4Q15
|Exodus 13:15–16 followed directly by 15:1
|Hebrew
|Hasmonean
|Fragments of Exodus about the Passover and a Hymn
|Martinez and Tigchelaar, The Dead Sea Scrolls Study Edition (Brill 1997): page 246
|-
|4QExod
|4Q16
|Exodus 13:3–5,15–16
|Hebrew
|Hasmonean
|Fragments of Exodus about the Passover and a Hymn
|
|-
|4QExod-Lev
|Exodus–Leviticus
|4Q17
|Exodus 38:18–22; 39:3–19, 20–24; 40:8–27; Leviticus 1:13–15, 17–2:1
|Hebrew
|Early Hellenistic
|Fragments of Exodus and Leviticus
|
|-
|4QExod
|rowspan="4"|Exodus
|4Q18
|Exodus 14:21–27
|Hebrew
|Hasmonean
|Fragments of Exodus
|
|-
|4QExod
|4Q19
|Exodus 6:3–6
|Hebrew
|Herodian
|Fragments of Exodus
|
|-
|4QExod
|4Q20
|Exodus 7:28–8:2
|Hebrew
|Herodian|| Fragments of Exodus
|
|-
|4QExod
|4Q21
|Exodus 36:9–10
|Hebrew
|Roman
|Fragments of Exodus
|
|-
|4QpaleoExod (olim 4QExα) || Paleo-Exodus
|4Q22
|Exodus 6:25–7:19,29–8:1,[5],12–22; 9:5–16, 19–21, 35–10:12, 19–28; 11:8–12:2,6–8, 13–15, 17–22, 31–32, 34–39; 13:3–8, 12–13; ... 37:9–16
|Hebrew
|Hasmonean; Paleo-Hebrew script
|Fragments of Exodus;
|
|-
|4QLev-Num || Leviticus–Numbers
|4Q23
|Leviticus 13:32–33; 14:22–34, 40–54; 15:10–11, 19–24; 16:15–29;... 27:5–13;...35:4–5
|Hebrew
|Hasmonean
|Fragments of Leviticus
|
|-
|4QLev
|rowspan=5|Leviticus
|4Q24
|Leviticus 1:11–17; 2:1–15; 3:1, 8–14; 21:17–20, 24; 22:1–33; 23:1–25, 40; 24:2–23; 25:28–29, 45–49, 51–52
|Hebrew
|Hasmonean
|Fragments of Leviticus
|
|-
|4QLev
|4Q25
|Leviticus 1:1–7; 3:16–4:6, 12–14, 23–28; 5:12–13; 8:26–28
|Hebrew
|Hellenistic-Roman
|Fragments of Leviticus
|
|-
|4QLev
|4Q26
|Leviticus 14:27–29, 33–36; 15:20–24; 17:2–11
|Hebrew
|Hellenistic-Roman
|Fragments of Leviticus
|
|-
|4QLev
|4Q26a
|Leviticus 2:4–6, 11–18; 3:2–4,5–8; 19:34–37; 20:1–3, 27–21:4, 9–12, 21–24; 22:4–6, 11–17
|Hebrew
|Hellenistic-Roman
|Fragments of Leviticus
|
|-
|4QLev
|4Q26b
|Leviticus 7:19–26
|Hebrew
|Hellenistic-Roman
|Fragments of Leviticus
|

|-
|4QNum
|Numbers
|4Q27
|Numbers 11:31–12:11; 13:7–24; 15:41–16:11, 14–16; 17:12–17; 18:25–19:6; 20:12–13,16–17,19–29; 21:1–2,12–13; 22:5–21, 31–34, 37–38, 41–23:6,13–15,21–22, 27–24:10; 25:4–8,16–18; 26:1–5,7–10,12,14–34,62–27:5,7–8,10,18–19,21–23; 28:13–17,28,30–31; 29:10–13,16–18,26–30; 30:1–3,5–9,15–16; 31:2–6, 21–25, 30–33,35–36,38,43–44,46–32:1,7–10,13–17,19,23–30,35,37–39,41; 33:1–4,23,25,28,31,45,47–48,50–52; 34:4–9,19–21,23; 35:3–5,12,14–15,18–25,27–28, 33–36:2,4–7
|Hebrew
|Herodian
|Fragments of Numbers. A few lines are written in red ink
|
|-
|4QDeut
|rowspan="15"|Deuteronomy
|4Q28
|Deuteronomy 23:26–24:8
|Hebrew
|175–150 BCE
Transitional: Archaic to Hasmonean
|Fragments of Deuteronomy
|
|-
|4QDeut
|4Q29
|Deuteronomy 29:24–27; 30:3–14; 31:9–17,24–30, 32:1–3
|Hebrew
|150–100 BCE
Early Hasmonean
|Fragments of Deuteronomy
|
|-
|4QDeut
|4Q30
|Deuteronomy 3:25–26; 4:13–17,31–32; 7:3–4; 8:1–5; 9:11–12, 17–19,29; 10:1–2,5–8; 11:2–4,9–13,18–19; 12:18–19,26,30–31; 13:5–7,11–12,16; 15:1–5,15–19; 16:2–3,5–11,20–17:7,15–18:1; 26:19— 27:2,24–28:14,18–20,22–25,29–30,48–50,61; 29:17–19; 31:16–19; 32:3
|Hebrew
|150–100 BCE

Hasmonean
|Fragments of Deuteronomy
|
|-
|4QDeut
|4Q31
|Deuteronomy 2:24–33; 3:14–29; 4:1
|Hebrew
|124–75 BCE

Middle Hasmonean
|Fragments of Deuteronomy
|
|-
|4QDeut
|4Q32
|Deuteronomy 3:24; 7:12–16,21–26; 8:1–16
|Hebrew
|50–25 BCE
Late Hasmonean
|Fragments of Deuteronomy
|
|-
|4QDeut
|4Q33
|Deuteronomy 4:23–27; 7:22–26; 8:2–14; 9:6–7; 17:17–18; 18:6–10,18–22; 19:17–21; 20:1–6; 21:4–12; 22:12–19; 23:21–26; 24:2–7; 25:3–9; 26:18–27:10
|Hebrew
|75–50 BCE
Late Hasmonean
|Fragments of Deuteronomy
|
|-
|4QDeut
|4Q34
|Deuteronomy 9:12–14; 23:18–20; 24:16–22; 25:1–5,14–19; 26:1–5; 28:21–25,27–29
|Hebrew
|1–25 CE
Middle Herodian
|Fragments of Deuteronomy
|
|-
|4QDeut
|4Q35
|Deuteronomy 1:1–17,22–23,29–41,43–2:6,28–30; 19:21; 31:9–11; 33:9–22
|Hebrew
|50–1 BCE
Transitional: Hasmonean to Early Herodian
|Fragments of Deuteronomy
|
|-
|4QDeut
|4Q36
|Deuteronomy 20:9–13; 21:23; 22:1–9; 23:6–8, 12–16, 22–26; 24:1
|Hebrew
|100–50 BCE
Late Hasmonean
|Fragments of Deuteronomy
|
|-
|4QDeut
|4Q37
|| Exodus 12:43–44, 46–51; 13:1–5; Deuteronomy 5:1–11, 13–15, 21–33; 6:1–3; 8:5–10; 11:6–10, 12–13; 30:17–18; 32:7–8
|Hebrew
|50 CE
Late Herodian
|Fragments of Exodus and Deuteronomy
|
|-
| 4QDeut
|4Q38
|Deuteronomy 5:28–31; 11:6–13; 32:17–18, 22–23, 25–27
|Hebrew
|30–1 BCE
Early Herodian
|Fragments of Deuteronomy
|
|-
|4QDeut
|4Q38a
|Deuteronomy 19: 8–16; 20: 6–19; 21:16; 23:22–26; 24:1–3; 25:19; 26:1–5, 18–19; 27:1
|Hebrew
|30–1 BCE
Early Herodian
|Fragments of Deuteronomy
|
|-
|4QDeut
|4Q38b
|Deuteronomy 30: 16–18
|Hebrew
|50 CE
Late Herodian
|Fragments of Deuteronomy
|
|-
|4QDeut
|4Q39
|Deuteronomy 10:1,14–15; 28:67–68; 29:2–5; 31:12; 33:1–2; 34:4–6,8
|Hebrew
|50 CE
Late Hasmonean
|Fragments of Deuteronomy about choosing Life or Death
|
|-
|4QDeut
|4Q40
|Deuteronomy 3:18–22; 4:32–33; 7:18–22
|Hebrew
|50–1 BCE
Transitional: Hasmonean to Herodian
|Fragments of Deuteronomy
|
|-
|4QDeut
|All Souls Deuteronomy
|4Q41
|Deuteronomy 5:1–33; 6:1; 8:5–10
|Hebrew
|30–1 BCE
Early Herodian
|Fragments of Deuteronomy
|
|-
|4QDeut
|rowspan="3"|Deuteronomy
|4Q42
|Deuteronomy 2:8; 4:30–34; 5:1–5, 8–9; 28:15–18, 33–36, 47–52, 58–62; 29:22–25
|Hebrew
|75–50 BCE
Late Hasmonean
|Fragments of Deuteronomy
|
|-
|4QDeut
|4Q43
|Deuteronomy 6:4–11
|Hebrew
|75–50 BCE
Late Hasmonean
|Fragments of Deuteronomy about Loving God
|
|-
|4QDeut
|4Q44
|Deuteronomy 32:9–10, 37–43
|Hebrew
|50 BCE–25 CE
Late Hasmonean or Early Herodian
|Fragments of Deuteronomy
|
|-
|4QpaleoDeut
|rowspan=2|Paleo-Deuteronomy
|4Q45
|Deuteronomy 7:2–7, 16–25; 11:28,30–12:1,11–12; 13:19; 14:19–22, 26–29; 15:5–6, 8–10; 19:2–3; 21:8–9; 22:3–6,12–15; 28:15–18, 20; 30:7–8; 32:2–8,10–11,13–14, 33–35; 33:2–8, 29; 34:1–2
|Hebrew
|100–25 BCE
Paleo-Hebrew script
|Fragments of Deuteronomy
|
|-
|4QpaleoDeut
|4Q46
|Deuteronomy 26:14–15
|Hebrew
|250–200 BCE
Archaic Paleo-Hebrew script
|Fragments of Deuteronomy about giving Tithes
|
|-
|4QJosh
|rowspan="2"|Joshua
|4Q47
|Joshua 8:34–35; 5:?,2–7; 6:5–10; 7:12–17; 8:3–14, 18?; 10:2–5, 8–11.
|rowspan="2"|Hebrew
|rowspan="2"|Hasmonean
|rowspan="2"|Fragments of Joshua
|
|-
|4QJosh
|4Q48
|Joshua 2:11–12; 3:15–16; 4:1–3; 17:11–15
|
|-
|4QJudg
|rowspan="2"|Judges
|4Q49
|Judges 6:2–6, 11–13
|rowspan="2"|Hebrew
|rowspan="2"|Herodian
|rowspan="2"|Fragments of Judges
|
|-
|4QJudg
|4Q50
|Judges 19:5–7; 21:12–25
|
|-
|4QSam || rowspan="3" | Samuel
|4Q51
|1 Samuel 1:9, 11–13, 17–18, 22–26, 28; 2:1–10,16–36; 3:1–4,18–21; 4:9–12; 5:8–12; 6:1–7,12–13,16–18,20–21; 7:1; 8:9–20; 9:6–8,11–12,16–24; 10:3–18,25–27; 11:1,7–12; 12:7–8,14–19; 14:24–25,28–34,47–51; 15:24–32; 17:3–6; 24:4–5,8–9,14–23; 25:3–12,20–21,25–26,39–40; 26:10–12,21–23; 27:8–12; 28:1–2,22–25; 30:28–30; 31:2–4; 2 Samuel 2:5–16,25–27,29–32; 3:1–8,23–39; 4:1–4,9–12; 5:1–3,6–16; 6:2–9,12–18; 7:23–29; 8:2–8; 10:4–7,18–19; 11:2–12,16–20; 12:4–5,8–9,13–20,30–31; 13:1–6,13–34,36–39; 14:1–3,18–19; 15:1–6,27–31; 16:1–2,11–13,17–18,21–23; 18:2–7,9–11; 19:7–12; 20:2–3,9–14,23–26; 21:1–2,4–6,15–17; 22:30–51; 23:1–6; 24:16–20
|Hebrew
|Herodian
|Fragments of 1 Samuel and 2 Samuel
|
|-
|4QSam
|4Q52
|1 Samuel 16:1–11; 19:10–17; 20:27–42; 21:1–10; 23:9–17
|Hebrew
|Early Hellenistic
|Fragments of 1 Samuel
|
|-
|4QSam
|4Q53
|1 Samuel 25:30–32; 2 Samuel 14:7–33; 15:1–15
|Hebrew
|Hasmonean
|Fragments of 1 Samuel and 2 Samuel
|
|-
|4QKgs
|Kings
|4Q54
|1 Kings 7:31–41; 8:1–9,16–18
|Hebrew
|Herodian
|Fragments of 1 Kings
|
|-
|4QIsa
|rowspan=13|Isaiah
|4Q55
|Isaiah 1:1–3; 2:7–10; 4:5–6; 6:4–7; 11:12–15; 12:4–6; 13:4–6; 17:9–14; 19:9–14; 20:1–6; 21:1–2,4–16; 22:13–25; 23:1–12
|Hebrew
|Hasmonean
|rowspan=13|Fragments of Isaiah
|
|-
|4QIsa
|4Q56
|Isaiah 1:1–6; 2:3–16; 3:14–22; 5:15–28; 9:10–11; 11:7–9; 12:2; 13:3–18; 17:8–14; 18:1,5–7; 19:1–25; 20:1–4; 21:11–14; 22:24–25; 24:2; 26:1–5,7–19; 35:9–10; 36:1–2; 37:2932; 39:1–8; 40:1–4,22–26; 41:8–11; 43:12–15; 44:19–28; 45:20–25; 46:1–3; 49:21–23; 51:14–16; 52:2,7; 53:11–12; 61:1–3; 64:5–11; 65:1; 66:24
|Hebrew
|rowspan=4|Herodian
|
|-
|4QIsa
|4Q57
|Isaiah 9:3–12; 10:23–32; 11:4–11,15–16; 12:1; 14:1–5,13; 22:10–14; 23:8–18; 24:1–15,19–23; 25:1–2,8–12; 30:8–17; 33:2–8,16–23; 45:1–4,6–13; 48:10–13,17–19; 50:7–11; 51:1–16; 52:10–15; 53:1–3,6–8; 54:3–17; 55:1–6; 66:20–24
|Hebrew
|
|-
|4QIsa
|4Q58
|Isaiah 46:10–13; 47:1–6,8–9; 48:8–22; 49:1–15; 52:4–7; 53:8–12; 54:1–11; 57:9–21; 58:1–3,5–7
|Hebrew
|
|-
|4QIsa
|4Q59
|Isaiah 2:1–4; 7:17–20; 8:2–14; 9:17–20; 10:1–10; 11:14–15; 12:1–6; 13:1–4; 14:1–13,20–24; 59:15–16
|Hebrew
|
|-
|4QIsa
|4Q60
|Isaiah 1:10–16,18–31; 2:1–3; 5:13–14, 25; 6:3–8,10–13; 7:16–18,23–25; 8:1,4–11; 20:4–6; 22:14–22,25; 24:1–3; 27:1,5–6,8–12; 28:6–9,16–18,22,24; 29:8
|Hebrew
|Hasmonean
|
|-
|4QIsa
|4Q61
|Isaiah 42:14–25; 43:1–4,17–24
|Hebrew
|Herodian
|
|-
|4QIsa
|4Q61
|Isaiah 42:4–11
|Hebrew
|Herodian
|
|-
|4QIsa
|4Q62
|Isaiah 56:7–8; 57:5–8
|Hebrew
|Hasmonean
|
|-
|4QIsa
|4Q63
|Isaiah 1:1–6
|Hebrew
|Herodian
|
|-
|4QIsa
|4Q64
|Isaiah 28:26–29:9
|Hebrew
|Hasmonean
|
|-
|4QIsa
|4Q65
|Isaiah 7:14–15; 8:11–14
|Hebrew
|Hasmonean
|
|-
|4QIsa
|4Q66
|Isaiah 60:20–61:1,3–6
|Hebrew
|Hasmonean
|
|-
|4QIsa
|rowspan="5"|Isaiah
|4Q67
|Isaiah 58:13–14
|rowspan=2|Hebrew
|rowspan=2|Hasmonean
|rowspan=5|Fragments of Isaiah, including elements on punishment (4Q67) and God's blessings for his people (4Q67, 4Q69a).
|
|-
|4QIsa
|4Q68
|Isaiah 14:28–15:2
|
|-
|4QIsa
|4Q69
|Isaiah 5:28–30
|rowspan=3|Hebrew
|rowspan=3|Hasmonean
|Martinez and Tigchelaar, The Dead Sea Scrolls Study Edition (Brill 1997): page 270
|-
|4QIsa
|4Q69a
|Isaiah 54:10–13
|
|-
|4QIsa
|4Q69b
|Isaiah 30:23
|
|-
|4QJer
| rowspan="5" |Jeremiah
|4Q70
| Jeremiah 6:30?, 7:1–2, 15–19, 28–9:2, 7–15; 10:9–14, 23; 11:3–6, 19–20; 12:3–7, 13–16, 17; 13:1–7, 22–23? [or 22:3], 27; 14:4–7; 15:1–2; 17:8–26; 18:15–23; 19:1; 20:14–18; 21:1?; 22:3–16; 26:10?
| rowspan="5" | Hebrew
| rowspan="5" | 200 BCE – 1 BCE
| rowspan="5" | Fragments of Jeremiah
|
|-
|4QJer
|4Q71
|Jeremiah 9:22–25; 10:1–21
|
|-
|4QJer
|4Q72
|Jeremiah 4:5, 13–16; 8:1–3, 21–23; 9:1–5; 10:12–13; 19:8–9; 20:2–5, 7–9, 13–15; 21:7–10; 22:4–6, 10–28; 25:7–8,15–17, 24–26; 26:10–13; 27:1–3, 13–15; 30:6–9, [10–17], 17–24; 31:1–14, 19–26; 33:?, 16–20
|
|-
|4QJer (olim 4QJer)
|4Q72a
|Jeremiah 43:2–10
|
|-
|4QJer  (olim 4QJer)
|4Q72b
|Jeremiah 50:4–6
|
|-
|4QEze
|rowspan=3|Ezekiel
|4Q73
|Ezekiel 10:5–16, 17–22; 11:1–11; 23:14–15, 17–18, 44–47; 41:3–6
|rowspan=3|Hebrew
|rowspan=3|Herodian
|rowspan=3|Fragments of Ezekiel
|
|-
|4QEze
|4Q74
|Ezekiel 1:10–13, 16–17, 19–24
|Sanderson 1997. DJD 15: 215–218.
|-
|4QEze
|4Q75
|Ezekiel 24:2–3
|
|-
|4QXII
|rowspan=7|The Twelve Minor Prophets
|4Q76
|Zechariah 14:18; Malachi 2:10–3:24; Jonah 1:1–5, 7–2:1, 7; 3:2
|rowspan=7|Hebrew
|rowspan=7|Herodian
|rowspan=7|Fragments of the Twelve Minor Prophets
|
|-
|4QXII
|4Q77
|Zephaniah 1:1–2; 2:13–15; 3:19–20; Haggai 1:1–2; 2:2–4
|
|-
|4QXII
|4Q78
|Hosea 2:13–15; 3:2–4; 4:1–19; 5:1; 7:12–13; 13:3–10, 15; 14:1–6; Joel 1:10–20; 2:1, 8–23; 4:6–21; Amos 1:1?; 2:11–16; 3:1–15; 4:1–2; 6:13–14; 7:1–16; Zephaniah 2:15; 3:1–2; Malachi 3:6–7?
|
|-
|4QXII
|4Q79
| Hosea 1:6–2:5
|
|-
|4QXII
|4Q80
|Haggai 2:18–19, 20–21; Zechariah 1:4–6, 8–10, 13–15; 2:10–14; 3:2–10; 4:1–4; 5:8–6:5; 8:2–4, 6–7, 12:7–12
|
|-
|4QXII
|4Q81
|Jonah 1:6–8, 10–16; Micah 5:1–2
|
|-
|4QXII
|4Q82
|Hosea 2:1–5,14–19, 22–25; 3:1–5; 4:1, 10–11, 13–14; 6:3–4, 8–11; 7:1, 12–13, 13–16; 8:1; 9:1–4, 9–17; 10:1–14; 11:2–5, 6–11; 12:1–15; 13:1, 6–8?, 11–13; 14:9–10; Joel 1:12–14; 2:2–13 4:4–9, 11–14, 17, 19–20; Amos 1:3–15; 2:1, 7–9, 15–16; 3:1–2; 4:4–9; 5:1–2, 9–18; 6:1–4, 6–14; 7:1, 7–12, 14–17; 8:1–5, 11–14; 9:1, 5–6, 14–15; Obadiah 1–5, 8–12, 14–15; Jonah 1:1–9; 2:3–11; 3:1–3; 4:5–11; Micah 1:7,
12–15; 2:3–4; 3:12; 4:1–2; 5:6–7 (7–8); 7:2–3, 20; Nahum 1:7–9; 2:9–11; 3:1–3, 17; Habakkuk 2:4?;
Zephaniah 3:3–5; Zechariah 10:11–12; 11:1–2; 12:1–3
|
|-
|4QPs
|rowspan="15" | Psalms
|4Q83
|Psalm 5:9–13; 6:1–4; 25:15; 31:24–25; 33:1–12; 35:2,14–20,26–28; 36:1–9; 38:2–12,16–23; 47:2; 53:4–7; 54:1–6; 56:4; 62:13; 63:2–4; 66:16–20; 67:1–7; 69:1–19; 71:1–14
|Hebrew
|Hasmonean
|rowspan="15"|Fragments of Psalms.
|
|-
|4QPs
|4Q84
|Psalm 91:5–8,12–15; 92:4–8,13–15; 93:5; 94:1–4,8–14,17–18,21–22; 96:2; 98:4; 99:5–6; 100:1–2; 102:5,10–29; 103:1–6,9–14,20–21; 112:4–5; 113:1; 115:2–3; 116:17–19; 118:1–3,6–11,18–20,23–26,29 ||Hebrew
|Herodian
|
|-
|4QPs & 4QPs
|4Q85 / 4Q98
|Psalm 16:7–9; 18:3–14,16–18,33–41; 27:12–14; 28:1–2,4; 35:27–28; 37:18–19; 45:8–11; 49:1–17; 50:14–23; 51:1–5; 52:6–11; 53:1 Psalm 88:15–17||Hebrew
|Herodian
| Longacre, Drew, and Brent A. Strawn. "A New Identification of a Psalm Manuscript from Qumran: 4Q85 + 4Q98c", Dead Sea Discoveries, doi: https://doi.org/10.1163/15685179-bja10037
|-
| 4QPs
|4Q86
|Psalm 146:10; 147:1–3,13–17,20; 104:1–5,8–11,14–15,22–25,33–35 ||Hebrew
|Hasmonean
|
|-
| 4QPs
|4Q87
|Psalm 76:10–12; 77:1; 78:6–7,31–33; 81:2–3; 86:10–11; 88:1–4; 89:44–46,50–53; 104:1–3,20–21; 105:22–24,36–45; 109:13; 115:15–18; 116:1–3; 120:6; 125:2–5; 126:1–5; 129:8; 130:1–3 ||Hebrew
|Herodian
|
|-
|4QPs
|4Q88
|Psalm 22:14–17; 107:2–4,8–11,13–15,18–19,22–30,35; 109:4–6, 25–28; Apostrophe to Zion; Apostrophe to Judah; Eschatological Hymn ||Hebrew
|Hasmonean
|
|-
|4QPs
|4Q89
|Psalm 119:37–43,44–46,49–50,73,81–83,90 ||Hebrew
|Herodian
|
|-
|4QPs
|4Q90
|Psalm 119:10–21 ||Hebrew
|Herodian
|
|-
|4QPs
|4Q91
|Psalm 48:1–7; 49:6,9–12,15,17 ||Hebrew
|Herodian
|
|-
|4QPs
|4Q92
|Psalm 26:7–12; 27:1; 30:9–13; 135:7–16; ||Hebrew
|Hasmonean
|
|-
|4QPs
|4Q93
|Psalm 104:3–5,11–12 ||Hebrew
|Herodian
|
|-
|4QPs
|4Q94
|Psalm 93:3–5; 95:3–6; 97:6–9; 98:4–8 ||Hebrew
|Herodian
|
|-
|4QPs
|4Q95
|Psalm 135:6–9,11–12; 136:23–24
|Hebrew
|Herodian
|
|-
|4QPs
|4Q96
|Psalm 114:7; 115:1–2,4; 116:3, 5, 7–10
|Hebrew
|Herodian
|
|-
|4QPs (olim 4Q237)
|4Q97
|Psalm 143:2–4, 6–8
|Hebrew
|Herodian
|
|-
|4QPs
|rowspan="8"|Psalms
|4Q98
|Psalm 31:24–25; 33:1–18; 35:4–20
|rowspan="8"|Hebrew
|rowspan="8"|Herodian
|rowspan="8"|Fragments of Psalms, including elements on putting one's hope in God (4Q98d), the earth shaking at the presence of God (4Q98e), the blessings of God's Children and the struggle of the wicked (4Q98f).
|
|-
|4QPs
|4Q98a
|Psalm 26:7–12; 27:1; 30:9–13
|
|-
|4QPs
|4Q98b
|Psalm 5:8–13; 6:1
|
|-
|*4QPs (see 4QPs)
|*4Q98c
|Psalm 88:15–17
|
|-
|4QPs
|4Q98d
|Psalm 42:5
|
|-
|4QPs (olim 4QPs frg. 2)
|4Q98e
|Psalm 99:1
|
|-
|4QPs
|4Q98f
|Psalm 112:1–9
|
|-
|4QPs (olim 4Q236)
|4Q98g
|Psalm 89:20–22, 26, 23, 27–28, 31
|
|-
|4QJob
|rowspan=2|Job
|4Q99
|Job 31:14–19; 32:3–4; 33:10–11, 24–26, 28–30; 35:16; 36:7–11, 13–27, 32–33; 37:1–5, 14–15
|rowspan=2|Hebrew
|Hasmonean
|rowspan=2|Fragments of Job
|

|-
|4QJob
|4Q100
|Job 8:15–17; 9:27; 13:4; 14:4–6; 31:20–21
|Herodian
|
|}

4Q101–4Q200

4Q201–4Q300

4Q301–
{|class="wikitable collapsible collapsed"
|-
! Fragment or Scroll Identifier
! Fragment or Scroll Name
! Alternative Identifier
! English Bible Association
! Language
! Date/Script
! Description
! Reference|-
|4QMystc
|The Book of MysteriesThe Book of Secrets
|4Q301
|
|Hebrew
|Herodian
|
|
|-
|4QRPb
|rowspan="4"|Reworked Pentateuch
|4Q364
|Genesis 25:18–21; 26:7–8; 27:39; 28:6; 29:32–33; 30:8–14,26–36; 31:47–53; 32:18–20,26–30; 34:2; 35:28; 37:7–8; 38:14–21; 44:30–34; 45:1,21–27; 48:14–15; Exodus 21:14–22; 19:17; 24:12–14,18; 25:1–2; 26:1,33–35; Numbers 14:16–20; 33:31–49; 20:17–18; Deuteronomy 2:8–14, 30–37; 3:2,18–23; 9:6–7,12–18, 21–25,27–29; 10:1–4, 6–7, 10–13,22; 11:1–2,6–9,23–24; 14:24–26
|Hebrew
|Late Hasmonean or Herodian
|rowspan="4"|Reworked Pentateuch
|
|-
|4QRPc
|4Q365
|Exodus 8:13–19; 9:9–12; 10:19–20; 14:10,12–21; 15:6-[21],22–26; 17:3–5; 18:13–16; 26:34–36; 28:16–20; 29:20–22; 30:27–38; 31:1–2; 35:[2]–5; 36:32–38; 37:29; 38:1–7; 39:1–19; Leviticus 11:1[3],17-[25],32-[33],[39]-[46]; 13:6–8,15-[19],51–52; 16:6–7; 18:[25]-[29]; 23:42–44; 24:1–2; 25:7–9; 26:17–32; 27:34; Numbers 1:1–5; 3:26–30; 4:47–49; 7:1,78–80; 8:11–12; 9:15–23; 10:1-[4]; 13:[11]–25,[28]–30; 15:26-[29]; 17:20–24; 27:11; 36:1–2; Deuteronomy 2:24; 19:20–21; 20:1 ||Hebrew
|Late Hasmonean/ Early Herodian||
|-
|4QRPd
|4Q366
|Exodus 21;35–37; 22:1–5; Leviticus 24:20–22; 25:39–43; Numbers 29:14-[25], 32–39; 30:1; Deuteronomy 16:13–14; 14:[13]–21
|Hebrew
|Herodian
|
|-
|4QRPe
|4Q367
|Leviticus 11:47; 12:1–8; 13:1; 15:14–15; 19:1–4,9–15; 20:13; 27:30–34
|Hebrew
|Hasmonean
|
|-
|4QapocrJosha
| rowspan="2" |Apocryphon of Joshua
|4Q378
|
|Hebrew
|Herodian
|rowspan="2" |Texts drawing on the content of Joshua, Exodus and Numbers.
|
|-
|4QapocrJoshb
|4Q379
|
|Hebrew
|Hasmonean
|
|-
|4QpsEzek
|Pseudo-Ezekiel
|4Q3854Q385b4Q385c4Q3864Q3884Q391
|
|Hebrew
|Herodian
|
|
|-
|4QMMT /4Q Cal.Doc.D
|Miqsat Ma'ase Ha-Torah or Some Precepts of the Law or the Halakhic Letter
|4Q394–399
|
|Hebrew
|Herodian
|
|
|-
|4Q Non-Canonical Psalms A
|Songs of Sabbath Sacrifice or the Angelic Liturgy
|4Q400–407
|
|Hebrew
|Hasmonean
|cf. 11Q5–6
|
|-
|4QInstruction
|Sapiential Work A
|rowspan=2|4Q415–418
|
|Hebrew
|rowspan=2|Herodian
|
|rowspan=2|
|-
| 4QParaphrase
| Paraphrase of Genesis and Exodus
|
|Hebrew
|
|-
|4Q Barkhi Nafshia
|Barkhi Nafshi – Apocryphal Psalms
|4Q434
|
|Hebrew
|Herodian
|15 fragments: likely hymns of thanksgiving praising God for his power and expressing thanks
|
|-
|4Q Apocr. Psalm and Prayer
|Hymn to King Jonathan or The Prayer For King Jonathan Scroll
|4Q448
|Psalms 154
|Hebrew
|Hasmonean
|In addition to parts of Psalms 154 it contains a prayer mentioning "King Jonathan".
|
|-
| 4QpapGen or papJub || pap-Genesis or pap-Jubilees
|4Q483
|Genesis 1:28–29, or Book of Jubilees ||Hebrew
|Herodian|| ||
|-
| 4QShira-b
| Songs of the Sageor Songs of the Maskil
| 4Q510–511
|
| Hebrew
| Herodian
|
|
|-
| 4Q Messianic Apocalypse
|  Messianic Apocalypse
| 4Q521
|
| Hebrew
| Hasmonean
| Made up of two fragments
|
|-
| 4Q Jonathan
|
| 4Q523
|
| Hebrew
| Hasmonean
| MeKleine Fragmente, z.T. gesetzlichen Inhalts; Fragment is legal in content. PAM number, 41.944
|4Q523 at the Leon Levy Dead Sea Scrolls Digital Library
|-
|4QTempleScrollb
|Temple Scroll
|4Q524
|
|Hebrew
|Hasmonean
|
|
|-
|4QBeatitudes
|
|4Q525
|Matthew 5:3 –12 (Beatitudes)
|Hebrew
|Herodian
|
|
|-
| 4Q TJoseph
| Testament of Joseph
|4Q539
|
| Aramaic
| Hasmonean
|
| 
|-
| 4QapocrLevi(?)b
| Testament of Levid
|4Q541
|
| Aramaic
| Hasmonean
| Aramaic frag. also called "4QApocryphon of Levib ar"
| 
|-
| 4QTKohath (4QTQahat)
| Testament of Qahat
| 4Q542
|
| Aramaic
| Hasmonean
|
| 
|-
| 4QNJc
| New Jerusalem
|4Q555
|
| Aramaic
| Herodian
| cf. 1Q32, 2Q24, 5Q15, 11Q18
| 
|-
| 4QGenn || Genesis
|4Q576
|| Genesis 34:7–10; 50:3 ||Hebrew
|Hasmonean|| || 
|-
| Unnumbered
|
|
|
|Hebrew
|
| Nine unopened fragments recently rediscovered in storage
|
|}

Gallery

See also 
 Biblical manuscripts
 Septuagint manuscripts
 List of Hebrew Bible manuscripts

Notes

References

Bibliography

External links
 A Catalog of Biblical Passages in the Dead Sea Scrolls by David Washburn, 2002
 Textual Criticism: Recovering the Text of the Hebrew Bible by Peter Kyle McCarter, 1986

1952 archaeological discoveries
Dead Sea Scrolls
Qumran Cave 4